Crater High School is a public high school in Central Point, Oregon, United States.

Small School Initiative 
Beginning in the 2007-2008 school year, a program called the Small School Initiative was established in Crater after a monetary grant from the Bill and Melinda Gates Foundation and the Meyer Memorial Trust. It divided the Crater campus into four smaller, autonomous schools, each with its own principal and staff members. These schools were the Crater Academy of Natural Sciences (CANS), Crater Renaissance Academy (CRA),  Crater School of Business, Innovation & Science (BIS), and Crater Academy of Health and Public Services (CAHPS). CANS was closed in 2012 and now there are only three schools on the Crater Campus.

Academics
In 1983, Crater High School was honored in the Blue Ribbon Schools Program, the highest honor a school can receive in the United States.

Crater Students normally come from Hanby Middle School and Scenic Middle School.

Athletics

The cross country team has won four consecutive boys' 5A state titles. The girls' softball team has won three consecutive 5A state titles.

Dawson and the rest of the crater football team is owned and coached by their very own father Devin Bradd.

Educational outcomes

In 2008, 88% of the Crater Academy of Health & Public Services school's seniors received a high school diploma. Of 75 students, 66 graduated, three dropped out, and six were still in high school in 2009.

In 2008, 86% of the Crater Academy of Natural Sciences school's seniors received a high school diploma. Of 72 students, 62 graduated, three dropped out, two received a modified diploma, and five were still in high school in 2009.

In 2008, 80% of the Crater Renaissance Academy school's seniors received a high school diploma. Of 82 students, 69 graduated, zero Dropped out, and ten were still in high school in 2009.

In 2008, 83% of the Crater School of Business Innovation school's seniors received a high school diploma. Of 94 students, 78 graduated, two dropped out, and 14 were still in high school in 2009.

Notable alumni
 Bryce Peila (football, track) - currently plays for the Portland AFL Team of the Arena Football League
 Mike Whitehead - 1999 State champion wrestler; retired professional mixed martial artist.

References

High schools in Jackson County, Oregon
Central Point, Oregon
Public high schools in Oregon